Marco D'Aloia (born 21 July 2001) is an Italian professional footballer who plays as a midfielder for Notaresco.

Career
Born in Cerreto Sannita, D'Aloia made his youth career in Parma and Pescara.

He was promoted to Pescara first team in 2020–21 Serie B season. D'Aloia made his professional debut on 1 May 2021 against Cosenza as a late substitute.

On 31 August 2021, he was loaned to Serie C club Latina.

On 2 February 2023, D'Aloia joined Serie D club Notaresco.

References

External links
 
 

2001 births
Living people
Sportspeople from the Province of Benevento
Footballers from Campania
Italian footballers
Association football midfielders
Serie B players
Serie C players
Parma Calcio 1913 players
Delfino Pescara 1936 players
Latina Calcio 1932 players